James Allen (born 4 July 1996) is a professional racing driver from Australia. He currently competes in the IMSA SportsCar Championship for G-Drive Racing by APR and has previously competed in the European Le Mans Series.

Career

European Le Mans Series
Allen first contested the European Le Mans Series in 2017 with Graff Racing's LMP2 entry. Allen, along with co-drivers Richard Bradley, Franck Matelli and Gustavo Yacamán drove the #40 Oreca 07 to a 3rd-place finish in the championship. Allen would stay on with Graff in 2018, driving the (now G-Drive branded) #40 entry to a 12th-place finish.

Allen would switch teams in ELMS 2019 to join DragonSpeed alongside Henrik Hedman, Ben Hanley and Renger van der Zande in the #21 entry. The team drove the Oreca 07 to a 5th-place finish.

Allen would return to Graff for the 2020 season, racing the #39 entry alongise Alexandre Cougnaud and Thomas Laurent. The team took 5th place in the championship.

Allen would change teams once again in 2021, joining Panis Racing alongside Julien Canal and Will Stevens. After testing positive for COVID-19 prior to round 1 at Barcelona, Allen was replaced by Gabriel Aubry, but would return in time for round 2. The team would finish 3rd in the championship, with Allen finishing 6th in the drivers championship.

FIA World Endurance Championship
Allen made his FIA World Endurance Championship debut in 2018 for DragonSpeed at the 6 hours of Fuji.

Racing record

Career summary

† Ineligible for points.

Complete European Le Mans Series results

Complete FIA World Endurance Championship results 
(key) (Races in bold indicate pole position) (Races in italics indicate fastest lap)

* Season still in progress.

Complete 24 Hours of Le Mans results

Complete WeatherTech SportsCar Championship results
(key) (Races in bold indicate pole position; results in italics indicate fastest lap)

References

External links
Career details from Driver Database

1996 births
Living people
Australian racing drivers
Formula Renault Eurocup drivers
24 Hours of Le Mans drivers
European Le Mans Series drivers
FIA World Endurance Championship drivers
Formula Renault 2.0 NEC drivers
Formula Renault 2.0 Alps drivers
WeatherTech SportsCar Championship drivers
JD Motorsport drivers
Graff Racing drivers
G-Drive Racing drivers
DragonSpeed drivers
Formula BMW drivers
TDS Racing drivers
R-ace GP drivers
ART Grand Prix drivers
Le Mans Cup drivers